While the traditional social fraternity is a well-established mainstay across the United States at institutions of higher learning, alternatives – in the form of social fraternities that require doctrinal and behavioral conformity to the Christian faith – developed in the early 20th century. They continue to grow in size and popularity.

History
Christian fraternities were established in the early part of the 20th century; the three largest were Beta Sigma Psi, Alpha Gamma Omega, and Sigma Theta Epsilon, which are still active.

Beta Sigma Psi 
Beta Sigma Psi, the oldest Christian fraternity, was founded as a national fraternity for Lutheran students in 1925 at the University of Illinois, home to the largest Greek system in the United States. The fraternity had its origins in the concerns of Rev. Frederick William Gustav Stiegemeyer, the son of a Lutheran pastor, who had been entrusted with the spiritual care of Lutheran students at the university. In the fall of 1919, he organized the Lutheran Illini League with a nucleus of ten students. At that time their intention was to meet once or twice a week for religious instruction and discussion on contemporary issues. In the fall of 1920, now with twenty members, the Lutheran Illini League rented a house. In early 1921, it reorganized as the Concordia Club. By 1923, the group regularly participated in campus activities; so much so that they began being referred to as the "Concordia Fraternity." On April 17, 1925, incorporation papers were filed for Beta Sigma Psi National Lutheran Fraternity in Springfield, Illinois. By 1970, Beta Sigma Psi had grown to eighteen chapters. The fraternity had ten active chapters as of 2016.

Alpha Gamma Omega 
Alpha Gamma Omega was established in 1927 at UCLA. The fraternity suffered a decline in chapters and membership before experiencing extensive national growth starting in 1987. As of 2020 it had sixteen active chapters.

Sigma Theta Epsilon 
Sigma Theta Epsilon is the result of the merger of two local Methodist-affiliated fraternities in 1941: Phi Tau Theta, founded in 1925, and Sigma Epsilon Theta, founded in 1936 at Indiana University. The merged fraternity was initially called Delta Sigma Theta, but the name was changed to Sigma Theta Epsilon in 1949 when a national sorority that was already using the name Delta Sigma Theta threatened legal action.

By the late 1950s, Sigma Theta Epsilon had grown to over twenty chapters. However, its numbers began to decline at the end of the 1960s. The fraternity became non-denominational in 1968. Down to only three chapters by the 1980s, Sigma Theta Epsilon began chartering new chapters again in 1988. The fraternity had twelve active chapters during the 2000s, but as of 2016 had only three active chapters.

Late 20th century
At the same time that the historic Christian fraternities were beginning to rebound from their declining numbers, other groups of Christian fraternities developed, with the rise of the Evangelical Christian movement. The largest, Beta Upsilon Chi, directly led to the founding of four other Christian Greek letter organizations. The second largest, Alpha Nu Omega, was founded three years later and Omega Kappa Psi in 1995.

The Texas Movement 
Beta Upsilon Chi was founded in 1985 on the campus of the University of Texas at Austin followed by Gamma Phi Delta in 1988, while Kappa Upsilon Chi was founded in 1993 on the campus of Texas Tech University. Beta Upsilon Chi founders declared it to be an alternative to the stereotypical fraternal lifestyle and set its purpose as "establishing brotherhood and unity among college men, based upon the common bond of Jesus Christ." Though originally conceived as a local Christian fraternity, efforts from Christian students at neighboring Texas schools convinced the founders of BYX to initiate new members and open new chapters.  In 1989, BYX leaders initiated men from Texas Christian University to establish the Beta chapter of Beta Upsilon Chi. As of 2017, Beta Upsilon Chi is the largest Christian social fraternity in the United States.

In 1993, Kappa Upsilon Chi was founded by four men who led Christian college ministries, some of whom graduated and entered into the ministry. The Alpha class contained some members formerly of Phi Gamma Delta social fraternity at Texas Tech. The fraternity sought to be a social alternative for Christian men.  While it originally had no intentions of expanding, the fraternity grew rapidly.

Megisté Areté Christian Fraternity 
In 1975, Mattie P. Dawson had a vision of a Christian sorority that would cater to the needs of Christian women on college campuses. That vision came to fruition in 1987 at the founding of Elogeme Adolphi Christian Sorority Inc. At the same time, her husband Bishop Harold Dawson had a vision of his own. His vision was that this sorority would have a brother fraternity of young men that would serve both as a covering for Elogeme and as a ministry to the needs of Christian college men. Megisté Areté Christian Fraternity Inc. was founded on May 7, 1989 on the campus of Illinois State University. Megisté is Greek for "greater" or "greatest," and Areté is Greek for "manhood" or "manliness". The organization has ten active chapters.

Omega Kappa Psi 
In 1995, Omega Kappa Psi (ΩΚΨ), was founded by one man who approached three other men with a convincing argument that Christian Brotherhood could grow in popularity as long as the truth was presented to young men. These four men established the Alpha chapter of the fraternity in Charlotte, NC on the campus of the University of North Carolina at Charlotte and sought out men with like-minds. The Alpha chapter tried to grow its ranks but was unable to maintain a steady membership due to young men wanting to be more social than Christian and ceased campus activities in 1997 after the death of one of its members. In 2017 the fraternity has resurfaced online seeking to reestablish itself and build an organization that is far reaching beyond a campus lifestyle setting so as not to confuse potential members to believe that they will only be a social fraternity. Today, its goal is to teach men to be leaders in the body of Christ and to shine a light into a dark world.

Beta Upsilon Chi 
Fifty-five chapters of Christian Greek letter organizations (GLO) trace their roots to the Texas Movement. Beta Upsilon Chi began in 1985. BYX, with thirty-eight chapters in Texas, Oklahoma, Tennessee, Arkansas, Mississippi, Georgia, Missouri, Florida, Louisiana, South Carolina, Kentucky, Alabama, Michigan, North Carolina and Indiana, remains the largest Christian fraternity in the United States. Mississippi was the first state to offer a Christian fraternity at all of its comprehensive four-year universities.

Alpha Nu Omega 
Alpha Nu Omega, Incorporated was founded in 1988 on the campus of Morgan State University. Its organizational purpose is to "present a Christian alternative to the students and or faculty on college/university campuses, to minister to the needs of the whole person (spirit, soul, and body), and to promote an attitude of academic excellence among its members." Alpha Nu Omega is established as far north as New York, as far south as Florida, and as far west as Ohio.  While most chapters are located at historically African-American colleges and universities, the organization does not consider itself an African-American Christian organization and welcomes all ethnicities. The organization exists as one organization but operates as two distinct entities: a fraternity and sorority.  The two are bound by one constitution. As of 2016, sixteen chapters were active.

Alpha Omega 
Alpha Omega Collegiate Ministries was founded in 1994 by Donyll Lewis on the campus of Western Michigan University in Kalamazoo, Michigan. The vision of Alpha Omega is based on Revelation 1:8 and the question, "Why join a man-made fraternity when the body of Christ is the largest fraternity in the world?" Its is co-ed and multicultural. The fraternity is based in Michigan. It has chapters as far north as Ferris State University in Big Rapids, Michigan and as far south as the University of Toledo, Bowling Green State University in Toledo-Bowling Green, Ohio.

Anointed Students In Unity Fellowship 
Anointed Students In Unity Fellowship Fraternity & Sorority, Inc. was founded on August 13, 1999 on the campus of Albany State University and incorporated on May 30, 2000. Founded by Shannon Thomas and fourteen other students, ASUF has grown to eight chapters in Georgia and Florida.

Theta Nu Gamma 
Seeing the need for unity among Christian men in his community and surrounding areas, Mario Jimerson began to seek God through prayer and fasting. He was awakened from his sleep one night with a vision to start a new Christian fraternity. This new organization would exemplify true brotherhood and the connection man needs in order to commune with God. In his vision, Mario saw the colors and the name of this new fraternity. With this, he began to write the constitution and bylaws. On Tuesday June 10, 2008, Theta Nu Gamma Christian Fraternity was created in Phoenix, Arizona. Its goal is to teach men to be leaders in the body of Christ and take their rightful place as head of the home.

List of fraternities

Notes

Branded chapters
Some non-religious national social fraternities allow individual chapters to brand themselves with unique ideals conforming to specific interests of the local members. Instances have arisen in which a singular chapter of an IFC-affiliated social fraternity brands itself a Christian chapter and initiates members on the basis of national membership standards as well as religious beliefs. One of the oldest such chapters is the Beta Alpha chapter of Theta Xi Fraternity at Georgia Tech which marked itself Christian in 1974. The chapter operates as a full social fraternity and member of IFC while pursuing Biblical masculinity and Christian brotherhood. The Beta Alpha chapter is currently the only Christian chapter of a secular fraternity. It expanded this model to a second chapter at Georgia Southern University; however, that chapter has since reverted to a non-religious chapter.

Legal challenges

Alpha Iota Omega and North Carolina
Alpha Iota Omega and the University of North Carolina clashed over the university's anti-discrimination policy. The fraternity refused to agree to the policy, which banned religious discrimination. As a result, Alpha Iota Omega was not officially recognized by the university for the 2003–2004 academic year. The fraternity sought assistance from the Foundation for Individual Rights in Education, a civil liberties group, and the Alliance Defense Fund, an American legal alliance defending religious liberties. A lawsuit was filed in the United States District Court for the Middle District of North Carolina on August 25, 2004, citing the incident in fall 2003 when UNC administrator Jonathan Curtis refused to extend the benefits of official recognition to AIO.

Beta Upsilon Chi and Georgia
In late 2006, Pi chapter of Beta Upsilon Chi at the University of Georgia was not registered as a student organization by university officials "because the group requires its members and officers to share the group's Christian beliefs." After months of negotiation between university officials, student officers of the local chapter and officials at the fraternity's national headquarters in Texas, attorneys with the Christian Legal Society and Alliance Defense Fund filed a civil rights suit on December 6, 2006 in federal court against the university on behalf of Beta Upsilon Chi. On December 7, 2006, the Atlanta Journal-Constitution reported that the University would remove the religion clause from the its anti-discrimination policy.

See also
 Christian sororities
 Cultural interest fraternities and sororities
 List of social fraternities and sororities

References

Fraternity